The first election to the Greater London Council (GLC) was held on 9 April 1964.

Background
The election happened at a time of very high political tension, with a general election due in a few months. The GLC did not come into its powers until 1 April 1965, but spent the first year setting up its committee structure and arranging with its predecessor authorities to take over.

Electoral arrangements
With no satisfactory sub-divisions in place, the electoral system used the new London boroughs as multi-member 'first past the post' electoral areas (the Parliamentary constituencies did not follow the Greater London boundaries).

Results
When the GLC had been created, many had assumed it would be a natural Conservative victory, but due to the exclusion of some Conservative-voting areas from the new boundaries and to the national trend of discontentment with the Conservative government and enthusiasm for the Labour opposition, Labour won a narrow victory in votes.

The large constituencies where the winner took all exaggerated Labour's win in votes into a near two-to-one lead in terms of seats. It also made it extremely difficult for the Liberal Party to win any seats. In addition to the 100 councillors, there were sixteen Aldermen who divided 11 to Labour and 5 to the Conservatives, and so the overall strength of the parties on the council was 75 Labour to 41 Conservatives.

With an electorate of 5,466,756, there was a turnout of 44.2%. Labour did particularly well to win Bexley and Havering, but performed poorly in Enfield which they might have expected to win. In Tower Hamlets, the Communist Party of Great Britain came in as runners-up with 8% of the vote.

Borough results

By-elections 1964-1967
Less than a month after the election, Marjorie McIntosh (Labour, Hammersmith) died and precipitated a byelection; however, given that the voters had elected the GLC and the new London Boroughs, the parties were short of money and the Conservatives decided not to oppose the Labour candidate who was returned unopposed on 18 June. Oliver Galley (Conservative, Harrow, died in October 1965 and the Conservatives retained his seat at a byelection on 27 January 1966. By the end of the term, there were two seats vacant due to the resignations of Sir Joseph Haygarth (Conservative, Barnet) and Mrs Mavis Webster (Labour, Waltham Forest).

References

1964 elections in the United Kingdom
1964 in England
1964 in London
1964
April 1964 events in the United Kingdom